The 2005–06 Tennessee Volunteers basketball team represented the University of Tennessee as a member of the Southeastern Conference during the 2005–06 NCAA Division I men's basketball season. Led by first-year head coach Bruce Pearl, the Volunteers played their home games at Thompson–Boling Arena in Knoxville, Tennessee. Tennessee finished on top of the SEC East division standings, but were knocked out of the SEC Tournament in the quarterfinal round. After receiving an at-large bid to the NCAA Tournament as the No. 2 seed in the East region, Tennessee slid past Winthrop in the opening round before losing to No. 7 seed Wichita State in the second round. The team finished the season with a 22–8 record (12–4 SEC).

Roster

Schedule and results

|-
!colspan=9 style=| Non-conference regular season

|-
!colspan=9 style=| SEC regular season

|-
!colspan=9 style=| SEC tournament

|-
!colspan=9 style=| NCAA tournament

Rankings

References

Tennessee Volunteers basketball seasons
Tennessee
Tennessee
Volunteers
Volunteers